Elva  may refer to:

Places
Elva, Estonia, town in Tartu County, Estonia
Elva Parish, municipality in Estonia
Elva (river), a river in Estonia
Elva, Illinois, unincorporated community in DeKalb County, Illinois, United States
Elva, Manitoba, unincorporated community in the Rural Municipality of Arthur, Manitoba, Canada
Elva, Piedmont, comune in the Province of Cuneo, Piedmont, Italy

People
Elva Bett (1918–2016), New Zealand artist, art historian and art gallery director
Elva A. George (c.1876–1953), American dietitian
Elva Goulbourne (born 1980), Jamaican long jumper
Elva Hsiao (born 1979), Taiwanese singer
Elva R. Kendall (1893–1968), American politician
Mrs. Elva Miller (1907–1997), American singer
Elva Nampeyo (1926–1985), American studio potter
Elva (cognomen), branch of the ancient Roman Aebutia family
Lucius Aebutius Elva (died 463 BC), Roman Republican consul
Postumus Aebutius Elva Cornicen (fl. 442–435 BC), Roman Republican consul
Titus Aebutius Elva (fl. 499 BC), Roman Republican consul

Other uses
Elva (album), album by Unwritten Law
Miss Elva, album by Elva Hsiao
Elva (car manufacturer), British sports car manufacturer
Elva (Inheritance), character in the Inheritance Cycle by American novelist Christopher Paolini
Elva Snow, musical project featuring Scott Matthew and Spencer Cobrin
FC Elva, Estonian football club based in Elva
11, in Swedish
 ELVA – (mobile platform) – mobile phone platform that allows organisations to map local needs and advocate change
McLaren Elva – open top sports car manufactured by British automobile manufacturer McLaren Automotive

See also
Elvas (disambiguation)